The School of Information Technology Kolkata (also SIT and formerly IIIT-C) is the Information Technology Department of the WBUT. The institution started as Indian Institute of Information Technology - Calcutta in 2000 with seed support from the government of West Bengal in association with the IT Industry.

The institute has research centers in Computer Vision/Computer Graphics, VLSI and Communication, Databases, Information Retrieval and Algorithms.

Located in  Salt Lake Sector-I, Kolkata.

The institute has computer laboratories which are allocated batch-wise to students. The labs are equipped with hardware and software. The PC to students ratio is about 1:2. All computers are part of an intranet (1 Gbit/s backbone). The institute has high bandwidth (8 Mbit/s) Internet connectivity round the clock. Research students have 24-hour access to the computer facilities. The students administer their own computer systems. The research centres and corporate schools provide specialised equipment for research and development.

Each year SIT holds its annual cultural and technical festival Algorhythm. Algorhythm attracts students from all major engineering and degree colleges across the country.
Renowned bands like Strings and Parikrama have performed at Algorhythm over the past few years. 

SIT was ranked fourth among the top T-schools in East India in 2006, in a survey by the DataQuest Magazine.

References

Information technology schools in India